Daily Mirror may refer to:

 Daily Mirror, a UK newspaper
 Daily Mirror (Sri Lanka), a Sri Lankan newspaper
 Ceylon Daily Mirror, a defunct Ceylonese newspaper
 Global Daily Mirror, a Philippine newspaper
 The Daily Mirror (Sydney), an Australian newspaper
 New York Daily Mirror, a defunct New York City newspaper
 New-York Mirror, a defunct New York City newspaper for which Edgar Allan Poe worked
The Daily Mirror, the local newspaper in the fictional town of Storybrooke, Maine on the fantasy television series Once Upon a Time.

See also
Der Tagesspiegel, a German newspaper whose name literally means "The Daily Mirror"